Apis mellifera sinisxinyuan (the Xinyuan honey bee) was first discovered in 2016 in Xinjiang Uygur Autonomous Region, Urumqi, Xinjiang, China, this subspecies has a range that is the farthest east known for the species of Apis mellifera (honey bees).

References 

mellifera sinisxinyuan
Western honey bee breeds